Garam may refer to:

Name 
 Károly Garam (born 1941), Hungarian-Finnish cellist
 Sami Garam (born 1967), Finnish cook and writer, son of Károly
 Jung Ga-ram (born 1993), South Korean male actor known for his role in Love Alarm
 Park Ga-Ram, a member of South Korean band DickPunks
 Yoon Bit-garam (born 1990), South Korean football player
 Kim Ga-ram (born 2005),  former member of South Korean girl-group Le Sserafim

Places 
 Garam, Republic of Buryatia, a rural locality (a settlement) in Yeravninsky District, Republic of Buryatia, Russia
 Garam, Hungarian name of river Hron, part of river Danube

Other uses 
 Garam (film), a 2016 Telugu film
 Garam masala, meaning "hot" + "spice mixture": a South Asian spice mixture

See also 

 Garum